Portrait of Nicolaus Kratzer is a 1528 half-length oil on canvas portrait by Hans Holbein the Younger. It is now in the Louvre, whilst a copy after it hangs in the National Portrait Gallery. It shows the astronomer Nikolaus Kratzer, a friend of Thomas More and Holbein himself. In his hand he holds a half-finished polyhedral sundial, whilst on the shelves behind him are a semi-circular star quadrant, a shepherd's dial and other instruments.

References

Kratzer
Kratzer
Paintings in the Louvre by Dutch, Flemish and German artists
Kratzer
1528 paintings